L'imprevisto, internationally released as The Mishap, is a 1961 Italian crime-drama film directed by Alberto Lattuada. It was coproduced by France, where it was released with the title L'Imprévu.

Cast 
 Anouk Aimée : Claire Plemian
 Tomas Milian : Thomas Plemian
 Raymond Pellegrin : Sérizeilles
 Jeanne Valérie : Juliette
 Jacques Morel : l'inspecteur de police 
 Yvette Beaumont : Suzanne

References

External links

1961 films
Films directed by Alberto Lattuada
1960s crime drama films
Italian crime drama films
1961 drama films
1960s Italian-language films
1960s Italian films